Charles Lim Yi Yong (born 10 July 1973) is a Singaporean contemporary artist and former Olympic sailor. Lim's work as an artist spans film, installation, sound, text, drawing, and photography. He co-founded the seminal Singapore-based internet art collective, tsunamii.net. In 2015, he represented Singapore at their national pavilion in the prestigious Venice Biennale, with the exhibition SEA STATE.

Lim was a former national sailor who competed in the 1996 Summer Olympics representing Singapore in the men's 470 event, and Team China in the 2007 America's Cup.

Career
In 2005, Lim began developing a body of work titled SEA STATE, which explores the political, biophysical and psychic contours of Singapore through the lenses of the sea. The artist's practice involves extensive research about Singapore's maritime history and its geography, examining the impact of mankind on the physical environment, and the relationships between nature and technology, land and sea.

References

External links
 

1973 births
Living people
Singaporean artists
Singaporean male sailors (sport)
Olympic sailors of Singapore
Sailors at the 1996 Summer Olympics – 470
Place of birth missing (living people)
Sailors at the 1994 Asian Games
Sailors at the 1998 Asian Games
Medalists at the 1994 Asian Games
Medalists at the 1998 Asian Games
Asian Games silver medalists for Singapore
Asian Games bronze medalists for Singapore
Asian Games medalists in sailing